Tchicaya U Tam'si (born Gérald-Félix Tchicaya 25 August 1931 - 22 April 1988) was a Congolese author; his pen name means "small paper that speaks for its country" in Kikongo.

Life
Born in Mpili, near Brazzaville, French Equatorial Africa (now Congo) in 1931, U Tam'si spent his childhood in France, where he worked as a journalist until he returned to his homeland in 1960. Back in Congo, he continued to work as a journalist; during this time he maintained contact to the politician Patrice Lumumba. In 1961, he started to work for UNESCO. He received Grand Prix at the 1966 first ever World Festival of Negro Art in Dakar.

He died in 1988 in Bazancourt, Oise, near Paris.

Since 1989, the Tchicaya U Tam'si Prize for African Poetry is awarded every two years in the Moroccan city of Asilah.

Style
U Tam'si's poetry incorporates elements of surrealism; it often has vivid historic images, and comments African life and society, as well as humanity in general.

Tribute
Tchicaya U Tam'si was awarded the Grand Prix de la Mémoire of the GPLA 2014.

Selected works
Ces fruits si doux de l'arbre a pain, 1990
Les Cancrelats, 1980
La Veste d'intérieur suivi de Notes de veille, 1977
L'Arc musical, Paris, 1970
Le Ventre, Paris, 1964
Épitomé, Tunis, 1962
À triche-coeur, Paris, 1960
Feu de brousse, Paris, 1957
Le Mauvais Sang, Paris, 1955

References

External links
Description of the U Tam'si's poetry as well as samples in English translation of his works

1931 births
1988 deaths
Republic of the Congo writers